FreakMind is a Spanish alternative metal-band started at the year 2001, in Madrid. From the first time, it was formed of Alberto, Dani, Javi  and Rubén. Totally they have published three studio albums  with the label "Underground, M-20 and a demo. Their musical style mixes alternative rock and nu metal, but their music is for the most defined Alternative Metal.

History
In December of 2001 Alberto (lead vocals) and Dani (drums), coming from Only For, next to other components, they begin to look for people to initiate a new musical project. Spent a time they know Javi (lead guitar) of Holocausto. In February 2002 After to have shuffled several names to put the group, chooses the one of FreakMind like the definitive one.

During the second week of December of 2002 FreakMind they record his first demo in the Cube studies of Madrid with Luis Tarraga (lead guitar of Hamlet) like producer and Alberto Seara (Sober, Savia, Hamlet, Skunk DF, Coilbox) like sound engineer. The songs that are included in this demo are Empty, Liquid Sand and Madness Threads. The Demo of the formation had a very good recognition between specialized means. To part of specialized means detailed later, numerous forums of Internet and pages also specialized have made a good welcome.

In the summer of the 2004, and after going and coming from some bass guitars and some reconstruction of the group, Ivan (bass guitar - The Dandelion) gets up the group. FreakMind bets by the studies M-20 (Madrid) and BigSimon (Mago de Oz, Stravaganzza, Coilbox, Terroristars, Skizoo) like producer to record and to mix its first CD “Six Degrees of Separation” in April–May 2005.
Ivan decides to leave the formation in the Summer of 2006. 

A few weeks Ruben (bass guitar) arrives at FreakMind, coming from Osmio.
"Six Degrees of Separation” is published in March 2007 by Lengua Armada.

Discography
 Demo - 2002
 Six Degrees of Separation - 2005
 A través de tus ojos - 2008
 42 días - 2009

Members
 Alberto - vocals
 Javi - guitar
 Rubén - bass
 Dani - drums

References

External links
  - Myspace
 FreakMind - Last.fm

Spanish heavy metal musical groups
Spanish rock music groups
Nu metal musical groups
Spanish alternative metal musical groups
Spanish alternative rock groups
Spanish progressive rock groups
Spanish post-rock groups